Ladislaus (IV) from the kindred Kán was a Hungarian lord, member of the gens Kán as the son of oligarch Ladislaus III Kán, the de facto ruler of Transylvania from 1295 until his death.

Following the death of his father in 1314 or 1315, Ladislaus IV declared himself Voivode of Transylvania, that title even used by King Charles I of Hungary when referring to him in a charter of 12 August 1315. Nicholas Pok, the voivode appointed by the monarch was unable to take up his office. However soon Ladislaus IV was also overshadowed by another rebellious lord, Mojs II Ákos, son in law of James Borsa. Mojs II defeated Voivode Pok who launched a royal campaign against the Transylvanian oligarchs. Later the Kán sons suffered a heavy defeat in the Battle of Déva in 1317. In 1321,  Charles' new Voivode, Thomas Szécsényi, seized Csicsó (present-day Ciceu-Corabia in Romania) which was the last fortress of Ladislaus Kán's sons. However until the end of the 1320s the Kán sons (Ladislaus IV and his namesake brother, Ladislaus V) were a serious threat to the royal power of Charles I through the continuous looting and raids. They also enjoyed the support of Basarab I of Wallachia.

Ancestors

References

Sources
 Bárány, Attila (2011). "Debreceni Dózsa küzdelme a bihari oligarchákkal [Dózsa Debreceni's Struggle with Oligarchs in Bihar]". In Bárány, Attila; Papp, Klára; Szálkai, Tamás. Debrecen város 650 éves. Várostörténeti tanulmányok. University of Debrecen, Történelmi Intézet. pp. 75–126.
 Kristó, Gyula (2003). Early Transylvania (895–1324). Lucidus Kiadó. .

Ladislaus IV
Voivodes of Transylvania